Angraecopsis cryptantha is a species of plant in the family Orchidaceae. It is endemic to Cameroon.  Its natural habitat is subtropical or tropical dry forests.

References 

Endemic orchids of Cameroon
Vulnerable plants
cryptantha
Taxonomy articles created by Polbot